The 2010–11 Elitserien season was Djurgårdens IF Hockey's 35th season in the Swedish elite league, Elitserien. The regular season began on away ice on 16 September 2010 against HV71 and concluded on 5 March 2011 away against Timrå IK. This season saw Djurgården's attempt to win the playoffs, after losing the previous season's final.

Djurgården finished sixth in the regular season and were faced against Luleå HF in the quarterfinals. Djurgården lost the first three games, but won the three following games to tie the series 3–3. However, Luleå knocked out Djurgården in the seventh and deciding game, winning in overtime.

Pre-season 
Djurgården lost several prominent players to NHL, including Jacob Josefson, Gustaf Wesslau, Kyle Klubertanz and Andreas Engqvist. However, in late May Djurgården signed on the replacements. Nils Ekman returned to Djurgården after seasons in the NHL and the KHL. Josef Boumedienne signed a 1+1 deal and Stefan Lassen was acquired from Leksands IF. Former Rögle forward Mario Kempe signed on in June.
Stefan Ridderwall was chosen to be the main goaltender for the season; a position he had shared with Wesslau during the previous season. Five players were brought up from Djurgården's youth program while one of them, goaltender Tim Sandberg, was loaned out to Sundsvall. Due to the uncertainty regarding Marcus Nilson's participation for the coming season, Djurgården signed Daniel Widing as a replacement in August.
Two new goaltender coaches, Thomas Magnusson and Mikael Gerdén, were signed in May when former goaltender coach Jonas Forsberg decided retire from coaching.

Djurgården began the pre-season by playing in the 2010 European Trophy tournament, an extended version of the former Nordic Trophy, which Djurgården won last season. The tournament previously contained only Finnish and Swedish teams, but was in the 2010 tournament expanded to Austria, Czech Republic, Germany and Switzerland. However, Djurgården missed the European Trophy playoffs this year, ending in the fifth spot with 12 points.

European Trophy

Standings

Game log

Stats 

Players

Goalkeepers

Regular season

Standings

Game log

Playoffs

Game log

Statistics 

from stats.swehockey

Skaters

Goaltenders

Roster 

Updated 12 January 2011.

|}

Transfers

Drafted players 

Djurgårdens IF players picked in the 2011 NHL Entry Draft at the Xcel Energy Center in St. Paul, Minnesota.

References 

2010-11
2010–11 Elitserien season